Melodifestivalen 2018 was the 58th edition of the Swedish music competition Melodifestivalen, which selected Sweden's entry for the Eurovision Song Contest 2018. The competition was organised by Sveriges Television (SVT) and took place over a six-week period between 3 February and 10 March 2018.

The format of the competition consists of 6 shows: 4 heat rounds, a second chance round and a final. An initial 28 entries were selected for the competition through three methods: an open call for song submissions, direct invitations to specific artists and songwriters and a wildcard given to one of the artists that participated in the Svensktoppen nästa competition organised by Sveriges Radio P4. The 28 competing entries were divided into four heats, with seven compositions in each. From each heat, the songs that earn first and second place qualify directly to the final, while the songs that place third and fourth proceed to the Second Chance round. The bottom three songs in each heat will be eliminated from the competition. An additional four entries qualify from the Second Chance round to the final, bringing the total number of competing entries in the final to 12. All 6 shows were hosted by David Lindgren and Fredrik Svensson, known as Fab Freddie.

The winner of the competition is Benjamin Ingrosso with the song "Dance You Off." He represented Sweden at the Eurovision Song Contest 2018 which was held in Lisbon, Portugal, where he came seventh with 274 points.

Format 
Melodifestivalen 2018, organised by Sveriges Television (SVT), was be the seventeenth consecutive edition of the contest in which the competition took place in different cities across Sweden. The four heats were held at the Löfbergs Arena in Karlstad (3 February), the Scandinavium in Gothenburg (10 February), the Malmö Arena in Malmö (17 February) and the Fjällräven Center in Örnsköldsvik (24 February). The Second Chance round took place at the Kristianstad Arena in Kristianstad on 3 March while the final was held at the Friends Arena in Stockholm on 10 March. An initial 28 entries competed in the heats, with seven entries taking part in each show. The top two entries from each heat advanced directly to the final, while the third and fourth placed entries advanced to the Second Chance round. The bottom three entries in each heat were eliminated. An additional four entries qualified for the final from the Second Chance round, bringing the total number of competing entries in the final to 12.

Presenters 
In October 2017, it was speculated by Swedish tabloid Aftonbladet that former Melodifestivalen contestant and host David Lindgren would be one of the presenters of this year's competition. On 2 November 2017, SVT confirmed that David Lindgren would be the host of the competition. Lindgren hosted the competition in 2017 and also competed as an artist in 2012, 2013 and 2016.

Competing entries 
The twenty-eight competing entries were announced to the public during a press conference on 28 November 2017.

Heats
As in previous years, Melodifestivalen commenced with four heats, which determined the eight entries that advanced directly to the final and the eight entries that qualified to the Second Chance round.

Heat 1
The first heat took place on 3 February 2018 at the Löfbergs Arena in Karlstad. A total of 6,617,451 votes were cast throughout the show with a total of 452,906 SEK collected for Radiohjälpen.

Heat 2
The second heat took place on 10 February 2018 at the Scandinavium arena in Gothenburg. A total of 5,880,237 votes were cast throughout the show with a total of 396,252 SEK collected for Radiohjälpen. Singer Petra Marklund, also known as September performed a cover of Lill-Babs's En tuff brud i lyxförpackning.

Heat 3
The third heat took place on 17 February 2018 at the Malmö Arena in Malmö. A total of 4,800,971 votes were cast throughout the show with a total of 432,824 SEK collected for Radiohjälpen.

Heat 4
The fourth heat took place on 24 February 2018 at Fjällräven Center in Örnsköldsvik. A total of 4,866,749 votes were cast throughout the show with a total of 385,483 SEK collected for Radiohjälpen.

Second Chance round
The Second Chance round took place on the 3rd of March 2018 at the Kristianstad Arena in Kristianstad. A total of 6,007,515 votes were cast throughout the show with a total of 346,287 SEK collected for Radiohjälpen.

Final
The Final took place on the 10th of March 2018 at the Friends Arena in Stockholm. A total of 13,993,975 votes were cast throughout the show with a total of 1,965,599 SEK collected for Radiohjälpen.

 A ^ Renaida was given a second chance to perform after Rolandz, due to an earpiece malfunction during her original performance.

Gallery

Notes

References

External links 
 Melodifestivalen Official Site

2018 song contests
February 2018 events in Sweden
Eurovision Song Contest 2018
March 2018 events in Sweden
2018
2010s in Malmö
2010s in Gothenburg
Events in Gothenburg
Events at Malmö Arena
Events in Karlstad
Events in Örnsköldsvik
Events in Solna
Events in Kristianstad
2018 Swedish television seasons
2018 in Swedish music